Ascaltis panis is a species of calcareous sponge in the family Leucascidae found in the Caribbean sea.

References
World Register of Marine Species entry

Clathrina
Sponges described in 1870
Taxa named by Ernst Haeckel